The Ritz-Carlton, Denver, formerly known as the Embassy Suites Downtown, is a skyscraper in Denver, Colorado. The building stands as the eighteenth-tallest building in Denver and Colorado.

The building was constructed as Park Suite Hotel in 1983, at which point it was the second-tallest hotel building in Denver, behind the  MCI Building, now known as 707 17th Street; this structure is a mixed use hotel and commercial property whose lowest 20 floors are occupied by a Private Condominium (floors 15-19) and a Ritz-Carlton (Ground-14). Embassy Suites operated 337 guest rooms in the tower, including several suites. The uppermost 17 floors of the tower consist of apartments. In 2005, the building began a renovation and conversion of its lower hotel floors to a Ritz-Carlton hotel and private wholly owned condominiums (floors 15-19). This conversion was completed in early 2008, and the hotel had its grand opening ceremony on January 11, 2008. On June 20th, 2020 Plant Holdings North America, Inc. purchased the property.

See also
List of tallest buildings in Denver

References

External links
Official website for The Ritz-Carlton, Denver

Residential skyscrapers in Denver
Denver
Residential buildings completed in 1983
Condo hotels in the United States
Skyscraper hotels in Denver